Siamese chess may refer to:

 Bughouse chess, variant of chess
 Makruk, board game